Gun Killers is a Canadian documentary film, directed by Jason Young and released in 2019. The film centres on John and Nancy Little, a married couple in rural Nova Scotia who have retired as blacksmiths, but continue to work privately for the Royal Canadian Mounted Police using their professional skills to melt confiscated illegal guns.

The film received a Canadian Screen Award nomination for Best Short Documentary at the 8th Canadian Screen Awards in 2020.

References

External links
Watch Gun Killers at the National Film Board of Canada

2019 films
Canadian short documentary films
National Film Board of Canada short films
National Film Board of Canada documentaries
2010s English-language films
2010s Canadian films
2019 short documentary films